This table shows the Philippine population by country of citizenship, the number of foreigners residing in the Philippines as recorded during the 2010 census. the foreigners in the Philippines can be both expats or immigrants.

See also
 Demographics of the Philippines
 Ethnic groups in the Philippines
 Philippine Statistics Authority

Notes

References

Lists by population
Demographics of the Philippines